Morteza Zarringol is an Iranian Kurdish politician.

Morteza Zarringol was mayor of Sanandaj and also member of parliament of Iran. He was the head of the Oil Commission in the parliament.

References

Iranian Kurdish politicians
Living people
Mayors of places in Iran
Members of the 5th Islamic Consultative Assembly
Year of birth missing (living people)
Place of birth missing (living people)